The Xinxim River is a tributary of the Iriri River in Pará state in north-central Brazil.

See also
List of rivers of Pará

References
Brazilian Ministry of Transport

Rivers of Pará